The County of Sponheim went through roughly three main phases during the course of the centuries. The first one lasted from the beginnings in the 11th century until the first divisions of the county between two Sponheimish lines around 1234. In this first period the region was ruled by a single count.

In the second phase the county was managed by two counts. The “Further” County (Vordere Grafschaft) of Sponheim was ruled by the line Sponheim-Kreuznach with residence at Castle Kauzenburg near Kreuznach. The "Hinder" County (Hintere Grafschaft) of Sponheim was ruled by the Sponheim-Starkenburg line, with residence at first at Castle Starkenburg near Enkirch and after 1350 at Castle Grevenburg near Trarbach. This phase lasted nearly to the extinction of both lines in 1437.

Finally in the third phase both parts of the county were managed by joint rulers as a condominium. The management of the “Hinder” County of Sponheim was divided between a collateral palatine line (House of Palatinate-Simmern, later House of Palatinate-Zweibrücken, later still House of Palatinate-Birkenfeld) and Baden, the management of the “Further” County of Sponheim roughly between Baden and the Electoral Palatinate. The ruling houses of the Sponheimish condominium were matrilineal descendants of the House of Sponheim and took on the title of Count at Sponheim (Graf zu Sponheim).

Counts of Sponheim

House of Sponheim

Successors in Upper and Lower Sponheim

Notes 
O.C. = Oldest Count

References 
  Mötsch, Johannes: Ein Kondominatsbesitz - Die Vordere und die Hintere Grafschaft Spohnheim (Website from Wolfgang Morscheck)
  Genealogia Sponhemica. Archiv für rheinische Geschichte Coblenz, 1.1833 - 2.1835. Zweiter Teil 1835. http://www.dilibri.de/rlb/periodical/pageview/27862

Sponheim
Sponheim
 
People from former German states in Rhineland-Palatinate